Keith Banner is an American writer, whose 2014 collection Next to Nothing: Stories was a shortlisted nominee for the Lambda Literary Award for Gay Fiction at the 27th Lambda Literary Awards in 2015.

Works
His prior publications include the novel The Life I Lead (1999) and the short story collection The Smallest People Alive (2004). His short stories have also been published in numerous anthologies and literary magazines.

Personal life
Banner lives in Cincinnati, Ohio with his partner Bill Ross, where he works as a social worker and a director of non-profit arts agencies.

References

Living people
20th-century American novelists
20th-century American male writers
21st-century American novelists
American male novelists
American social workers
American gay writers
Writers from Cincinnati
American male short story writers
Year of birth missing (living people)
20th-century American short story writers
21st-century American short story writers
21st-century American male writers
Novelists from Ohio